Clay County School District may refer to:

Clay County School District (Alabama)
Clay County School District (Florida)
Clay County School District (Georgia)
Clay County School District (Mississippi)
Clay County School District (North Carolina)